Joan Elizabeth Vennochi (born January 27, 1953) is an American newspaper columnist. She specializes in local and national politics at The Boston Globe. With Stephen A. Kurkjian, Alexander B. Hawes Jr., Nils Bruzelius, and Robert M. Porterfield she won the 1980 Pulitzer Prize for Local Investigative Specialized Reporting.

Biography
Vennochi earned her BS degree from the Boston University College of Communication in 1975 and later earned her JD degree from the Suffolk University Law School, the latter institution where she is also a part-time faculty member and senior lecturer.

Vennochi works as a columnist for the Op-ed page for the Boston Globe. Previously she covered national and Massachusetts politics along with writing a business column.

References

External links
 Joan Vennocchi, brief biography at The Boston Globe (archived 2007-11-07)
Vennochi on big dig politics (2006) 

1953 births
American columnists
The Boston Globe people
Pulitzer Prize for Investigative Reporting winners
Boston University College of Communication alumni
Suffolk University Law School alumni
Place of birth missing (living people)
Living people
American women columnists
21st-century American women